Lourde-Mary Rajeswari (L. R. Eswari) is a veteran playback singer of the Tamil cinema, Telugu cinema, Malayalam cinema and Kannada cinema industries. She also sang in other languages like Hindi, Tulu, and English. She has won Kalaimamani, the Tamil Nadu's state award, for her contributions to the film industry.

Recorded film songs 
This is only a partial list; L. R. Eswari has sung over 7000 songs in Tamil, Kannada, Telugu, Malayalam and Hindi.

Tamil film songs

1950s

1960s

1970s

1970

1971

1972

1973

1974

1975

1976

1977

1978

1979

1980s

1990s

2011-2020

Telugu songs

1960s

1970s

1980s

2010s

2020s

Kannada songs

1960s

1970s

1980s

1990s

2000-2010s

Malayalam songs

Hindi songs

References 

Lists of songs recorded by Indian singers